The 2014–15 FAW Welsh Cup was the 128th season of the annual knockout tournament for competitive football teams in Wales. The 2014–15 tournament commenced on 23 August 2014, and ended on 2 May 2015. The New Saints were the defending champions and successfully defended its title by defeating Newtown in the final.	
This meant The New Saints qualified to the first qualifying round of the 2015–16 UEFA Europa League.

Qualifying round one
The matches were scheduled to be played on the weekend of 30/31 August 2014.

Qualifying round two
The matches were scheduled to be played on the weekend of 13/14 September 2014.

Round one
The matches were scheduled to be played on the weekend of 4/5 October 2014.

Round two
Round Two matches were largely played on the weekend of 8/9 November 2014 - although some had to be postponed because of bad weather.

Notes

Round three
The matches are scheduled to be played on the weekend of 29/30 November 2014.

Round Four
The matches are scheduled to be played on the weekend of 7/8 February 2015.

Quarter-finals
The matches are scheduled to be played on the weekend of 7/8 March 2015.

Semi-finals
The matches are scheduled to be played on the weekend of 4/5 April 2015. The first semi-final was played at Newtown's Latham Park ground while the second was held at the ground of Cefn Druids.

Final
The final was played on the day of Saturday 2 May 2015 at Latham Park, Newtown, Powys.

|}

References

External links
Schedule
BBC Sport Welsh Cup 2014-15

2014-15
1